The men's soccer tournament at the 2013 Canada Summer Games was held at the Université de Sherbrooke Stadium and Bishop's University in Sherbrooke, Quebec. 

The matches were held between August 12 and 17, 2013. Quebec won the gold medal, with British Columbia taking the silver and Ontario taking the bronze.

Men

Group A

Group B

Group C

Group D

Schedule

Final ranking

References

Soccer at the 2013 Canada Summer Games